Yara ten Holte (born 23 November 1999) is a Dutch handball player for Borussia Dortmund Handball and the Dutch national team.

She represented Netherlands at the 2021 World Women's Handball Championship in Spain.

In December 2022, she signed a four-year contract with Odense Håndbold.

References

1999 births
Living people
Sportspeople from Amsterdam
Dutch female handball players
Expatriate handball players
Dutch expatriate sportspeople in Germany
21st-century Dutch women